Walter Lewis Thomas (October 22, 1911 – September 28, 1983), nicknamed "Bancy", was an American Negro league pitcher in the 1930s and 1940s.

A native of Doyle, Alabama, Thomas was the brother of fellow Negro leaguer Orrel Thomas. He made his Negro leagues debut in 1935 with the Chicago American Giants, and later played for the Detroit Stars, Kansas City Monarchs, and Birmingham Black Barons. Following his Negro league career, Thomas played for the Carman Cardinals of the Mandak League for several seasons in the early 1950s. He died in Big Rapids, Michigan in 1983 at age 71.

Thomas's grandson, Richie Martin, is a shortstop for the Baltimore Orioles.

References

External links
 and Baseball-Reference Black Baseball stats and Seamheads

1911 births
1983 deaths
Birmingham Black Barons players
Chicago American Giants players
Detroit Stars (1937) players
Kansas City Monarchs players
Baseball pitchers
Baseball players from Alabama
20th-century African-American sportspeople